Cadra abstersella is a species of snout moth in the genus Cadra. It was described by Zeller in 1847, and is known from Italy, France, Spain, Corsica, Croatia, Greece and Crete.

References

Phycitini
Moths described in 1847
Moths of Europe